The Penrith Ice Palace (also known as Penrith Ice Rink.) was an ice sports and public skate centre, located west of Sydney in Penrith, New South Wales, Australia. It permanently closed on Wednesday 29th June 2022 It served as the home ice rink of the Penrith Valley Figure Skating Club, AJIHL teams Sydney Sabres (formally Sydney Lightning) and Sydney Wolf Pack (formally Sydney Maple Leafs). It twice was the home venue of the Australian Ice Hockey League (AIHL) team Sydney Bears between 2007–11 and 2015-16.

Facilities

Facilities at Penrith Ice Palace are detailed below:

 60 m × 30 m ice rink (Olympic sized)
 1,500 seating capacity for spectators (raised above the ground level)
 Skate hire
 Canteen
 Proshop
 Onsite parking
 Street parking

The inside temperature is 10 °C to 15 °C and the ice temperature is kept at -5 °C to -9 °C.

Events

Penrith Ice Palace offers regular events including public ice skating sessions, children's party packages, Friday night disco sessions, learn to skate school, ice hockey development, figure skating, ice hockey and broomball.

Since 2012, the Ice Palace has hosted regular Australian Junior Ice Hockey League matches between the months of November to March.

See also
 List of ice rinks in Australia
 Sport in New South Wales

References

External links
 Official website
 Official AJIHL website

2000 establishments in Australia
Figure skating venues in Australia
Ice hockey venues in Australia
Indoor arenas in Australia
Sports venues in Sydney
Sports venues completed in 2000
Penrith, New South Wales